Paul Joüon (1871 – 1940 in Nantes) was a French Jesuit priest, hebraist, Semitic language specialist and member of the Pontifical Biblical Institute. Author of a philological and exegetical commentary on the Book of Ruth (1924), he also wrote A Grammar of Biblical Hebrew for which he received the Volney Prize from the Institute of France. First published in 1923, Joüon's grammar, enjoying numerous editions as well as an English translation, continues to serve as an important reference to this day.

Joüon was the student of French rabbi and orientalist Mayer Lambert.

Publications
 Le Cantique des Cantiques, Commentaire philologique et exégétique, Éditeur G.Beauchesne, 1909, Paris.
 Grammaire de l'hébreu biblique, 624 pages, Éditrice Pontificio Istituto Biblico, (première édition 1923, deuxième édition corrigée 1965, réimpressions en 1987, 1996, et 2007), Rome 
 Ruth. Commentaire philologique et exégétique, Institut Biblique Pontifical, 1924, Rome.
 Libri Ruth textum hebraicum ad usum scholarum edidit Pontificium Institutum Biblicum, 1921, Rome.
 Articles sur la philologie sémitique (dans Mélanges de la Faculté Orientale de Beyrouth, dans Orientalia, et dans Biblica).
 L'Évangile de Notre-Seigneur Jésus-Christ, traduction et commentaire du texte grec tenant compte du substrat sémitique, Éditeur G. Beauchesne, 1930, Paris.

See also
Study of the Hebrew language

References

External links
 

1871 births
1940 deaths
Clergy from Nantes
French biblical scholars
French Hebraists
19th-century French Jesuits
20th-century French Jesuits
Grammarians of Hebrew
Christian Hebraists
Bible commentators
Old Testament scholars